Leatherstocking may refer to:

 The Leatherstocking Tales, a series of five novels by James Fenimore Cooper
 Leatherstocking (serial), a serial movie
 Leather Stocking, silent short film
 Leatherstocking Council
 Leatherstocking Falls, a waterfall in Otsego County, New York
 Leatherstocking Creek, a creek in Otsego County, New York

See also

Central New York Region, formally called Central Leatherstocking Region